The year 1988 was the 17th year after the independence of Bangladesh. It was also the seventh year of the Government of Hussain Muhammad Ershad.

Incumbents

 President: Hussain Muhammad Ershad
 Prime Minister: Mizanur Rahman Chowdhury (until 27 March), Moudud Ahmed (starting 27 March)
 Chief Justice: F.K.M. Munim

Demography

Climate

Flood
Bangladesh experienced heavy rain and flooding in the last two weeks of August. By the first week of September the situation further deteriorated. Nearly 25 million people were rendered homeless and official death toll exceeded 500. About 30,000 km of roads were partially destroyed and rice crop on 3.5 million hectares was destroyed or damaged. The situation started to improve in late September, but people rendered homeless due to the flood continued to struggle. Different countries including Australia, Denmark, United Kingdom, Japan, Ireland, Canada, Norway, Sweden, Belgium, India, Iraq, Kuwait, Nederlands, Turkey, France, Pakistan, Qatar, KSA and United States as well as agencies including UNDRO, WHO, UNDP, EEC, Caritas, SCF-US, World Vision, LRCS, CCDB, Red Cross, WFP joined the Bangladesh Government in the relief operations.

Cyclone

The 1988 Bangladesh cyclone (designated as Tropical Cyclone 04B by the Joint Typhoon Warning Center) was one of the worst tropical cyclones in Bangladeshi history. Striking in November 1988, the tropical system exacerbated the catastrophic damage from what was then considered the worst floods in Bangladesh's history. The tropical cyclone originated from a disturbance that developed within the Strait of Malacca on 21 November. Tracking slowly westward, the initial tropical depression reached tropical storm status in the Andaman Sea. On 26 November, the storm reached an intensity equivalent to that of a modern-day severe cyclonic storm and subsequently turned northward. Gradually intensifying as it had previously, the tropical cyclone reached peak intensity with winds of 125 mph (200 km/h) as it was making landfall near the Bangladesh-West Bengal border on 29 November. Although the storm retained strong winds well inland, it was last monitored over central Bangladesh as a moderate cyclonic storm-equivalent on 30 November.

The brunt of the tropical cyclone's damage was inflicted upon coastal areas of Bangladesh and West Bengal. A total of 6,240 people were killed as a result of the storm, with 5,708 in Bangladesh and 538 in West Bengal. Many of the deaths were a result of the destruction of homes or electrocution after strong winds toppled power poles across the region. Along the coast of Bangladesh, strong storm surge caused heavy infrastructure damage and contributed in wiping out an estimated 70% of all harvestable Bangladeshi crops, with an estimated 200,000 tonnes (220,000 tons) of crops being lost. Widespread power outages cut telecommunications across Bangladesh; in Dhaka, Bangladesh's capital city, debris-laden streets paralyzed traffic while electrical outages caused water shortages.

Economy

Note: For the year 1988 average official exchange rate for BDT was 31.73 per US$.

Events
 24 January – Activists of Awami League, rallying in the streets of Chittagong were attacked by the police. Chittagong Metropolitan Police Commissioner Mirza Rakibul Huda ordered the police to open fire on the rally which left at least 24 people dead.
 3 March – General election is held, Jatiya Party gets overwhelming majority with 68.44% of the votes.
 2 December – The worst cyclone for 20 years strikes Bangladesh. The cyclone eventually leaves 5 million homeless and thousands dead.

Awards and recognitions

International Recognition
 Mohammad Yeasin, the promoter of Deedar Comprehensive Village Development Cooperative Society, was awarded the Ramon Magsaysay Award.

Independence Day Award

Ekushey Padak
 Bonde Ali Miah (literature)
 Ashraf Siddiqui (literature)
 Fazal Shahabuddin (literature)
 Anwar Hossain (drama)
 Sudhin Das (music)

Sports
 Olympics:
 Bangladesh sent a delegation to compete in the 1988 Summer Olympics in Seoul, South Korea. Bangladesh did not win any medals in the competition.
 Domestic football:
 Mohammedan SC won Dhaka League title while Abahani KC came out runner-up.
 Abahani KC won Bangladesh Federation Cup.
 Cricket:
 The Third Asia Cup (also known as the Wills Asia Cup) was held in Bangladesh between 26 October and 4 November. Four teams took part in the tournament: India, Pakistan, Sri Lanka and the host nation Bangladesh. The matches were the first-ever List A-classified being played in Bangladesh, then an Associate Member of the International Cricket Council (ICC), their opponents all being Full Members. Bangladesh lost all 3 of their matches in the tournament.

Births
 1 May – Ashraful Islam Rana, footballer
 15 June – Mohamed Zahid Hossain, footballer
 1 November – Mohammad Shahid, cricketer
 12 December – Mamunul Islam, footballer

Deaths

 2 February – Quamrul Hassan, painter (b. 1921)
 24 August – Abu Jafar Shamsuddin, author (b. 1918)

See also 
 1980s in Bangladesh
 Timeline of Bangladeshi history

References